The 2015 Baltic Futsal Cup was held from November 27 to 29, 2015 in Estonia.

Standings

Matches

Goalscorers 
8 goals
  Maksims Seņs

3 goals
  Mikko Kytölä

2 goals

  Ramūnas Radavičius
  Miika Hosio
  Arsenij Buinickij

1 goal

  Mindaugas Labuckas
  Paulius Sakalis
  Evaldas Kugys
  Rolandas Leščius
  Martin Moroz
  Justinas Zagurskas
  Robert Veskimäe
  Jevgeni Merkurjev
  Rasmus Munskind
  Kristjan Paapsi
  Vladislav Tšurilkin
  Andrejs Aleksejevs
  Panu Autio
  Joni Pakola
  Mikko Kytölä
  Juhana Jyrkiäinen
  Konstantins Zabarovskis
  Igors Dacko

Own goals
  Maksim Aleksejev (vs. Lithuania)

Awards 

 Top Scorer
  Germans Matjušenko (8 goals)

References

External links 
Futsal Planet

2015
2015 in Lithuanian football
2015 in Latvian football
2015 in Estonian football
2015 in Finnish football
International futsal competitions hosted by Estonia
2015–16 in European futsal